Rhabdogyna is a genus of South American sheet weavers that was first described by Alfred Frank Millidge in 1985.  it contains only two species, both found in Chile: R. chiloensis and R. patagonica.

See also
 List of Linyphiidae species (Q–Z)

References

Araneomorphae genera
Linyphiidae
Spiders of South America
Endemic fauna of Chile